George R. Batcheller (1892–1938) was an American film producer. He ran the low-budget studio Chesterfield Pictures in the 1930s.

Selected filmography
 The Last Chance (1926)
 The Secrets of Wu Sin (1932)
 Slightly Married (1932)
 Women Won't Tell (1932)
 Murder on the Campus (1933)
 Rainbow Over Broadway (1933)
 Love Is Dangerous (1933)
 Cross Streets (1934)
 The Quitter (1934)
 In Love with Life (1934)
 The Lady in Scarlet (1935)
 False Pretenses (1935)
 A Shot in the Dark (1935)
 The Dark Hour (1936)
 House of Secrets (1936)
 Below the Deadline (1936)
 Red Lights Ahead (1936)

References

Bibliography
 Michael R. Pitts. Poverty Row Studios, 1929–1940: An Illustrated History of 55 Independent Film Companies, with a Filmography for Each. McFarland & Company, 2005.

External links

1892 births
1938 deaths
American film producers
Businesspeople from Providence, Rhode Island
20th-century American businesspeople